I Against I is the third studio album by the American rock band Bad Brains. It was released on November 21, 1986 through SST Records with the catalog number SST 065. The best-selling album in the band's catalog, I Against I  finds the band branching out from their early hardcore punk style to touch on funk, soul, reggae and heavy metal. It is also included in the book 1001 Albums You Must Hear Before You Die. The title track was a Paul Rachman-directed video (Rachman would go on to direct the documentary film American Hardcore).

The title I Against I presumably refers to the common Rastafarian phrase I and I, which is used in place of the first-person plural (i.e. we) to signify the union of the speaker, audience, and Jah (God) in love and peace.

At the producer's suggestion, the vocals to "Sacred Love" were recorded over the phone from the prison where H.R. was serving time on a marijuana distribution 
charge.

Track listing
All songs written by Paul Hudson, Darryl Jenifer, and Gary Miller except where noted.

"Intro" (Jenifer, Miller) – 1:02
"I Against I" – 2:50
"House of Suffering" (P. Hudson, Miller) – 2:29
"Re-Ignition" – 4:16
"Secret 77" – 4:04
"Let Me Help" – 2:17
"She's Calling You" (P. Hudson, Jenifer) – 3:42
"Sacred Love" – 3:40
"Hired Gun" – 3:45
"Return to Heaven" – 3:19

Legacy
I Against I has influenced diverse rock artists. Ska punk band Sublime and its follow-up project, Sublime with Rome, frequently cover "House of Suffering" and bassist Eric Wilson said that I Against I inspired them to blend different genres. The Dillinger Escape Plan singer Greg Puciato named it one of the four albums that changed his life, as well as "a critical step" in shaping his vocal style. Max Cavalera of Sepultura states that the beginning of 1996 song "Straighthate" was probably inspired by "I Against I" since his band admired the Bad Brains. According to Harley Flanagan of the Cro-Mags, the verse riff in 1986's "The Age of Quarrel" was based on the last part of "I Against I". Tim Commerford of Rage Against the Machine mentioned the album as one of his biggest influences. Danko Jones called the title track "one of the greatest songs ever written as far as I'm concerned." Beppo of German punk band Spermbirds affirmed, "I Against I had a huge impact on us, they taught us that you can also be hard by playing slow."

"I Against I" was covered by Jeff Buckley in 1992, BoySetsFire and Brother's Keeper in 1999, and Lamb of God in 2018; "House of Suffering" has been covered by Sublime in 1995, Machine Head in 1999 and The Bled in 2005; "Let Me Help" was covered by Potshot in 2000; and "Sacred Love" was covered by Storm Large in 2014. In 2019, Bad Brains rerecorded the title track with rapper Denzel Curry as a guest vocalist for a Spotify single.

"Re-Ignition" has been sampled on "Daddy's Home" by Chubb Rock, "Ice Man Cometh" by 2 Black 2 Strong MMG, "Ultrasonic Sound" by Hive (which later appeared on The Matrix soundtrack), and on a remix of the 2004 song "Roll Call" by Lil Jon and Ice Cube. A live version of "Re-Ignition" was featured in Guitar Hero: Warriors of Rock. "Re-Ignition" appeared on a 2019 episode of Black Lightning. The Canadian teen drama Degrassi: The Next Generation, which names each episode after a 1980s song, named an episode after the song "I Against I".

Accolades

Personnel
Bad Brains
 H.R. – lead vocals
 Dr. Know – guitar
 Darryl Jenifer – bass
 Earl Hudson – drums

Production
 Ron Saint Germain – producer
 Phil Burnett – engineer
 Patch – mixing
 Jesse Henderson; Bill Ryan – assistant engineers
 Eddie Krupski; Dennis Mitchell – additional mixing
 Bob Ludwig – mastering
 Marcia Resnick – photography, cover concept
 Paul Bacon Studio – calligraphy and development

Release history

References

External links

I Against I (Adobe Flash) at Radio3Net (streamed copy where licensed)

1986 albums
Bad Brains albums
Albums produced by Ron Saint Germain
Funk rock albums
SST Records albums